Lim Por-yen (c. 1914 – 18 February 2005) was a Hong Kong industrialist. He founded the Lai Sun Group, and his family was the biggest shareholder of Asia Television.

Biography
Lim Por-yen was born in Chaoyang, Guangdong, and moved to Hong Kong with his father in 1931.

In 1945, he started a factory manufacturing garments in Sham Shui Po for export. Lim earned himself the nickname of "African King" in the 1950s when he exported cheap military uniforms to African countries. His company, Lai Sun Garment, was founded in 1947, and later listed on the Hong Kong Stock Exchange.

He successfully diversified into real estate in 1987 when he set up another vehicle, Lai Sun Development. In the same year, Lai Sun acquired the Crocodile Garments business.

Public service and philanthropy
Deeply attached to his hometown and China, he started a massive program of donations in the 1980s. He founded four secondary schools in Shantou. In 1994, he founded a technical college there with a donation of ¥35 million, and endowed Shantou City Education Foundation with a further ¥10 million. He is said to have made in excess of ¥700 million in donations to causes throughout China, of which Shantou's share was more than half. He has been a supporter of education in Hong Kong by setting up several schools.

He also donated to the University of Hong Kong's SARS Fund and helped to establish the Jao Tsung-I Petite Ecole. His support of the HKU Foundation and to the university in general over the years earned him an honorary fellowship in 2003. Lim also endowed an Eye Genetics Research Center (named after him) at the CUHK in 2004.

Lim was a Hong Kong Affairs Adviser to Beijing. He also served on the Preparatory Committee and Selection Committee of the SAR. He was a founding member of the Better Hong Kong Foundation.

Corruption conviction
Lim was implicated in the largest bribery scandal in Taiwan at the time. Lim was arrested by Taiwan's Bureau of Investigation on accusations that he offered NT$200 million in bribes to several officials of the Taipei County Land Administration Bureau, including its former director.

Lim owned some land originally slated for farming and industrial use. After Lim bought it, officials allocated the land for the new National Taipei University, allowing him to sell the land back to Taipei County for more than NT$890 million (US$28.6 million), an estimated NT$300 million above market value. He is alleged to have bribed officials to rezone the land. 

In 1999, he was found guilty on charges of bribery and money laundering through the land deals, but his prison sentence of 38 months was reduced by one year.  His appeal of this conviction was still under consideration at the time of his death.

Personal
Lim was married four times and had seven biological children and an adopted son from his older brother. At his death he remained legally married to his first wife, Lai Yuen-Fong (賴元芳) .

His second wife, U Po-chu (余寶珠), is a 50-year veteran of the garment industry and is a non-executive director of Lai Sun Garment. His third wife is Gu Shui-Ying (顧瑞英) and his fourth wife is Choy Yim-yu (蔡艷如).

Lim's eldest son, Lam Kin-ming (林建名), works for Lai Sun's Crocodile Garments. His second son, by his second wife, U Po-chu, is Peter Lam, head of Media Asia Group and the Lai Sun Group. Their relations were under considerable strain when Peter acquired Furama Hotel Enterprises without consulting him. Lim Por-yen also had a daughter, Pearl Lam, from whom he was estranged, reportedly due to debts incurred from a property investment. She runs an art gallery and reports that her parents disapproved of her art career, forcing her to study accounting and financial management, and later law. He has a son, Lam Kin-hong (林建康), who is responsible for mainland property investments in Hong Kong-listed Lai Fung Holdings.

On 10 December 2004, he gifted his 33.73% stake in Lai Sun International equally to Peter and his mother.

Death
Lim died on 18 February 2005 at Queen Mary Hospital in Pok Fu Lam, from a lung infection; he was in his 90s.

Notes
For verification purposes, the following are relevant citations in Chinese from the CCTV article dated 17 October 2005

References

1910s births
2005 deaths
Asia Television
Businesspeople from Guangdong
Chinese money launderers
Hong Kong criminals
Hong Kong philanthropists
Hong Kong racehorse owners and breeders
Hong Kong textiles industry businesspeople
Lai Sun Group
People from Chaoyang District, Shantou
Members of the Preparatory Committee for the Hong Kong Special Administrative Region
Hong Kong Affairs Advisors
Members of the Selection Committee of Hong Kong
20th-century philanthropists
Chinese emigrants to British Hong Kong